The 1900 Colorado Agricultural Aggies football team represented Colorado Agricultural College (now known as Colorado State University) in the Colorado Football Association (CFA) during the 1900 college football season. In his first season as head coach following the death of previous head coach W. J. Forbes, George Toomey posted a 1–3 record, outscored by a total of 109 to 16.

Schedule

References

Colorado Agricultural
Colorado State Rams football seasons
Colorado Agricultural Aggies football